Mata Sarthal Devi Mandir is an important Hindu temple at Sarthal of Kishtwar district in Jammu and Kashmir (union territory) of India. This temple is famous for annual pilgrimage known as Sarthal Yatra.

Overview 
A Hindu shrine, Sarthal Mata is famous for annual pilgrimage known as Sarthal Yatra. The idol which is considered as re-incarnation of Goddess Durga, was originally carved from stones by locals during the period of Raja Agar Dev of Kishtwar and later, renovated by Maharaja Hari Singh in 1936. It is situated at approximately 6000 feet and usually covered with snow during winters.

History
According to the local legend, Shri Paul who was the first saint from Kishtwar region, had directed his disciples to worship goddess durga in the form of Mother with 18 Arms. The legend goes on to say that one of the locals was able to invoke goddess in the form of a young girl who pointed towards the eighteen armed idol of goddess. King Agar Dev of Kishtwar is then believed to send his courtiers to make a temple for the idol at an appropriate place. It is said that the Idol became too heavy to be carried beyond its present abode at Sarthal where a Stone Temple was constructed.

Management 
The management of the temple lies with Dharmarth Trust that takes care of the running of the temple. An Inn (Dharamshala) has been constructed next to the temple where pilgrims can stay for the night at nominal payments.

Annual Pilgrimage 
Annual pilgrimage (in the month of July) to the temple is an important event in the local calendar when people from nearby villages throng the temple to receive blessings of the goddess. People bring in tridents (trishul) to the temple. The temple boasts of trident collection that is hundreds of years old. During the Dogra Rule, this pilgrimage was known as "Sarkari Yatra" during which there was a 3-day holiday in entire Doda district for celebration of this yatra. It is considered auspicious to have Mundan (First Hair removal of a baby) at the temple. It has a dedicated vehicular road starting from Hasti (Near Kishtwar) that leads unto the base of temple. The temple is situated on the top of a hillock, and has some difficult stairs to be climbed to reach the top.

Sarthal Mata Idol Theft 
The ancient Asthdash Buja Mata (Mother with 18 arms) black stone Idol of Mata Sarthal Devi was stolen in 2008 from the temple. However, the idol could not be smuggled out of the area and was recovered and reinstalled at the temple. This incident caused anguish amongst the local people.

References

Hindu goddesses
Hindu temples in Jammu and Kashmir
Hindu pilgrimage sites in India
Durga temples